The 7th Korea Drama Awards is an awards ceremony for excellence in television in South Korea. It was held at the Gyeongnam Culture and Art Center in Jinju, South Gyeongsang Province on October 1, 2014. The nominees were chosen from Korean dramas that aired from October 2013 to September 2014.

Nominations and winners
(Winners denoted in bold)

References

External links 
  
 7th Korea Drama Awards  at Daum 

Korea Drama Awards
Korea Drama Awards
Korea Drama Awards